Michael Anthony Rosati (born January 7, 1968) is a Canadian-born Italian former professional ice hockey player. Rosati became the third Italian player to play in a game in the NHL after earning an Italian passport and playing for Italy, after Bob Manno and Roberto Romano.

Early years
As a youth, Rosati played in the 1981 Quebec International Pee-Wee Hockey Tournament with a minor ice hockey team from Wexford, Toronto.

Rosati started his career by playing in the Ontario Hockey League and was soon drafted by the New York Rangers in 1988 NHL Entry Draft (#131 pick). Rosati was initially placed in the ECHL, but after a disappointing season, decided to play in Italy. Rosati would find much more success there, and played for the Hockey Club Bolzano. In the 1990s Rosati would lead Bolzano to two Italian Hockey Championships, and would earn himself the place of goaltender for the Italian national team that would go on to compete in the 1994 and 1998 Winter Olympics.

The 1990s and the NHL experience
By the second half of the 1990s, the Italian hockey movement had gone through a difficult period, and Rosati moved to Germany. It was here that Rosati played for Adler Mannheim of the DEL. In 1998, after two seasons of consistent play with Adler Mannheim, Rosati signed with the Washington Capitals as the third goaltender of the team, behind Olaf Kölzig and Craig Billington. After the shift to the farm team Portland Pirates, it seemed that Rosati's chances to play in the NHL were fading away, and that he was destined to spend his career in the minor leagues, but an injury to Craig Billington put him directly on the bench. On November 7, 1998, the incumbent Capitals goalie, Olaf Kölzig, suffered an injury, and Rosati made his NHL debut against the Ottawa Senators in a match won by the Capitals 8–5. Rosati played 28 minutes and didn't allow a goal. His NHL saves total stands at 12. He finished the season with the Manitoba Moose of the IHL. Despite a less than stellar stint with the Moose, Rosati decided to come back to Mannheim where he played four more seasons.

Retirement and coaching
Rosati retired in 2004 while playing for a German second division team. In the 2004–05 season, Rosati was the Adler Mannheim assistant coach and worked with Stéphane Richer and Helmut de Raaf (who played with Rosati for multiple seasons).

Rosati is currently the goaltending coach of the Vegas Golden Knights in the NHL. He enjoys spending time with his 2 daughters, Jessica and Alyssa, who are his biggest supporters. In the offseason, Rosati lives in Niagara Falls.

Career statistics
Career statistics.

1984–85 St. Michael's Buzzers (OJHLB)
1986–89 Hamilton Steelhawks (relocated: Niagara Falls Thunder) (OHL)
1989–90 Erie Panthers (ECHL)
1990–96 Hockey Club Bolzano (Italian Serie A)
1996–98 Adler Mannheim (DEL)
1998–99 Portland Pirates (AHL) – Washington Capitals (NHL)
1998–99 Manitoba Moose (IHL)
1999–03 Adler Mannheim (DEL)
2003–04 Heilbronn Falcons (German 2. Bundesliga)

See also
List of players who played only one game in the NHL

References

External links

1968 births
Living people
Adler Mannheim players
Bolzano HC players
Canadian ice hockey goaltenders
Canadian people of Italian descent
Erie Panthers players
Hamilton Steelhawks players
Ice hockey people from Toronto
Ice hockey players at the 1994 Winter Olympics
Ice hockey players at the 1998 Winter Olympics
Italian ice hockey goaltenders
Manitoba Moose (IHL) players
New York Rangers draft picks
Niagara Falls Thunder players
Olympic ice hockey players of Italy
Portland Pirates players
Washington Capitals players
Canadian expatriate ice hockey players in Italy
Canadian expatriate ice hockey players in Germany